Karl Emil Lischke (30 December 1819, in Stettin – 14 January 1886, in Bonn) was a German lawyer, politician, diplomat, and amateur naturalist. He is best known for his contributions to malacology (study of molluscs).

Lischke was born in 1819 in Stettin, then a city in the German Empire, now the capital city of West Pomeranian Voivodeship, Poland.  He studied law in Berlin, then returned to Stettin and was appointed a magistrate in 1840.  In 1847 he served as a military attaché to the Prussian ambassador to the United States of America in Washington, D.C.  Lischke was mayor of Elberfeld from  3 December 1850 to 1 January 1873.

Throughout his life Lischke maintained a keen interest in natural sciences, particularly in the study of molluscs. He was particularly interested in the mollusc species of Japan. 

His daughter Emmy Lischke (1860-1919) was a German painter known for her landscapes and still lifes.

References

1819 births
1886 deaths
19th-century German zoologists
19th-century German lawyers
German diplomats
Scientists from Szczecin
Mayors of places in North Rhine-Westphalia
People from Elberfeld
People from the Province of Pomerania
Politicians from Szczecin